Audiopathik is a dark psychedelic trance act from Sonora, Mexico.

Biography 

Their unique and distinctive sound, described by Mushroom Magazine as "fast, dark and twisted, but with humorous and even light moments shining through", has fueled the psytrance dancefloors worldwide since 2004.

They have released tracks on labels such as  Devils Mind Records, Mass Abduction, Pleiadian Records, Hypnotica, Geomagnetic.tv, Shaman Films, 5th Element Records, Caffix Records, D-A-R-K Records, Dark Prisma, Planet B.E.N, amongst others.

Audiopathik is considered an avant-garde act in the dark psytrance scene.

Discography 
 CD Album Releases
 Global Killer (Acidance Records, 2008) --- GREECE
 Over the Edge (Pleiadian Records, 2011) --- MEXICO

Compilations
 VA - DURDOM [Devils Mind Records] - "Corrosive Material"   --- SWEDEN
 VA - DESERT ENCOUNTERS [Mass Abduction - "Chainsaw Massacre, Flesh" --- USA
 VA - AH PUCH [Shaman Films] - "Eye of the Beast" --- USA
 VA - BLAH [Hypnotica Records] - "Aversion Creation" --- SWEDEN
 VA - PROJECT DATA [Mass Abduction Records] - "There will be blood" --- USA
 VA - CYVILIZED CHAOS [Geomagnetic.tv] - "Speak of the devil" --- ISRAEL
 VA - THE NORDLAND ORCHESTRA [Dark Prisma] - "Lokutus Welcome"--- ARGENTINA
 VA - GRATEFUL DANCE [Geomagnetic.tv] - "Pandemoniak" --- USA
 VA - CHRONICLES [5th Element Records] - "Abraxas" --- MEXICO
 VA - TETAKAWI TALES [Pleiadian Records] - "Smells like a good idea" --- MEXICO
 VA - TRIP CONTROLLERS - [Geomagnetic.tv] - "Traumatik Amnesia" --- USA
 VA - EXTRATERRESTRIAL COMICS [Mass Abduction] - "Ala Verga" --- USA
 VA - CEREBRAL OVERLOAD [Mental Mechanix] - "Regis Inferni" --- AUSTRALIA
 VA - DIGITAL DRUGS 3 [Geomagnetic.tv] - "Juramento Malsano" --- USA
 VA - NO MERCY FOR THE WEAK [5th Element] - "4 da wicked" --- MEXICO
 VA - DANZA DEL VENADO [Pleiadian Records] - "sick music 4 sick people" --- MEXICO
 VA - RAINDROPS IN THE FOREST [Psybertribe Records] - "Sour Soul Syrup" --- USA
 VA - TRIP FORMATION [Triplag Music] - "Devil Making Faces" --- IRELAND
 VA - MISTERY OF NITZZY [5th Element Records] - "To be continued.." --- MEXICO
 VA - FREE TECHNODROME [Ulstravision Records] - "Freedom to dance" --- SPAIN
 VA - GOA TRANCE MISSIONS Vol.1 NIGHT [Goa Records] - "Traumatic Amnesia" --- USA
 VA - GUERREROS AZTECAS [Biomechanix Records] - "Brainscratcher" --- MEXICO
 VA - INNER BELIAL [Caffix Records] - "Malleus Maleficarum" --- MEXICO
 VA - OPTOPLANAR [Urban Antidote Records] - "Brain Melt" --- ALEMANIA
 VA - PLEIADIAN CONNECTION [Pleiadian Records] - "Killin Machin', Teletracer" --- MEXICO
 VA - PSYCHOSOMATIC- [Digital Drugs Coalition] "Stutter" --- USA
 VA - ZAMURAI  [Rockdenashi Records] - "De* VAstation" --- JAPAN
 VA - TEN REASONS TO EAT DUST  [5th Element] - "Bass Rider", "Machete" --- MEXICO
 VA - TANETSVETA [Tantrumm Records] - "R. U. Happy" --- USA in collaboration with PSYKOVSKY (Russia)
 VA - FALSE CENTER [Lamat Records] - "Geez" --- GUATEMALA
 VA - THE MUSHROOM SPEAKS [Lamat Records] - "Slaughterhouse RMX" --- GUATEMALA
 VA - UNIVERUS A UM  [Kamino Records] - "Mind Meld" "Rich Pitch"  --- MEXICO
 VA - PYTAGOREAN [Acidance Records] - "Hiroshi* VA" - GREECE
 VA - AUDITORY CODE [Pleiadian Records] - "Inner Decoder" - MEXICO
 VA - WAQT HA PSY KA [Namo Records] - "This is the Sound" - OMAN
 VA - SYNTHETIC LIFEFORMS [Damaru Records] - "Crazy Diamond" - GERMANY
 VA - EXTRA SOLAR PLANETS [Maniac Psycho Pro] - "Concentrate" - ISRAEL
 VA - BLASTED FREAKS [Freak Records] - "Blasting Donkeys" - SWITZERLAND
 VA - ALCHEMY OF SOUNDS [Disco Valley Records] - "Anihilated (Audiopathik Rmx)" - INDIA
 VA - DOUBLE TROUBLE [Black Out Records] - "Right Now" - GERMANY
 VA - STAR BEINGS [Pleiadian Records] - "Interdimensional", "Free Your Mind", "Modulation Orgy" - MEXICO
 VA - NAMOTRON [Namo Records] - "Spectral Classification" - OMAN
 VA - CHEMICAL MONSTERS 2 [ManiacPsychoPro] - "To the Stars" - ISRAEL
 VA - PSYLORDS [Warromaja Records] - "Quantum Void", "Psylords" - BELGIUM
 VA - EL NIMR [Namo Records] - "Everything is possible" - INDIA
 VA - STAR BEINGS 2 [Pleiadian Records] - "Knob Twisters", "OMG", "Ultimate Reality" - MEXICO

Digital Releases
 EP - NECRO [D-A-R-K Records] -- Canada
 EP - ANGER AUDIO [D-A-R-K Records] -- Canada 
 VA - GRIMORIUM VERUM [USOE] - "Harum Scarum, Les Tenebres"—Macedonia
 VA - CIRCLES OF LIFE - [Mind Expansion Records] - "Dead Overflow"—Alemania
 VA - GENERATION OF PSYTRANCE 3 [PLANET BEN] - vs Mexican Trance Mafia "Sell your soul"—Germany
 VA - DOUBLE THE DOSE Vol. 2 - [Digital Drugs Coalition] "Stutter" --- USA
 VA - DAMAGED BRAIN - [Ultravision Records] - "Dirty Lil beast"—Spain

Notes

External links
 Audiopathik website
 Audiopathik on Facebook
 Audiopathik on Soundcloud
 Audiopathik on Instagram
 Audiopathik Discography at Discogs
 Audiopathik on iTunes

Living people
Goa trance musicians
Psychedelic trance musicians
People from Sonora
Year of birth missing (living people)